Hector Glacier is located in Banff National Park, Alberta, Canada. In 1938, a large mass of the glacier broke off and covered the valley below with ice up to 60 m (200 ft) thick. The ice mass destroyed everything in its path and this is only the second known glacier hazard to have been recorded in the Canadian Rockies. The glacier, along with Mount Hector and Hector Lake are all named after James Hector, a prominent early naturalist to the region.

See also
List of glaciers

References

Banff National Park
Glaciers of Alberta